Group C of UEFA Euro 1996 was one of four groups in the final tournament's initial group stage. It began on 9 June and was completed on 19 June. The group consisted of Germany, Italy, the Czech Republic and Russia.

Using FIFA World Rankings as a measure of the strength of the teams, The Guardian calculated in 2007 that the strongest "Group of Death" of all time was the Euro 1996 Group C. The teams (and world rankings) were Germany (2), Russia (3), Italy (7) and the Czech Republic (10). This record was surpassed by the May 2012 rankings for Euro 2012 Group B, with Germany (2), the Netherlands (4), Portugal (5) and Denmark (10), but not the June rankings immediately before the tournament (3, 4, 10 and 9 respectively).

Germany won the group and advanced to the quarter-finals, along with the Czech Republic. Italy and Russia failed to advance.

Teams

Notes

Standings

In the quarter-finals,
The winner of Group C, Germany, advanced to play the runner-up of Group D, Croatia.
The runner-up of Group C, Czech Republic, advanced to play the winner of Group D, Portugal.

Matches

Germany vs Czech Republic

Italy vs Russia

Czech Republic vs Italy

Russia vs Germany

Russia vs Czech Republic

Italy vs Germany

References

External links
UEFA Euro 1996 Group C

Group C
Group
Group
Group
Group